Alexander Luthor Jr. is a fictional character appearing in comic books published by DC Comics.

Publication history
Created by Marv Wolfman and George Pérez, the character made his first appearance in Crisis on Infinite Earths #1 (April 1985). He had a prominent role in that series, and appeared 20 years later as one of the two primary antagonists of the sequel Infinite Crisis, alongside Superboy-Prime.

Fictional character biography

Crisis on Infinite Earths

Alexander Luthor Jr. is born on Earth-Three, the son of that world's Lex Luthor (known as Alexander Luthor) and Lois Lane-Luthor. Luthor Sr. is Earth-Three's only hero, fighting the Crime Syndicate (an evil version of the Justice League of America). In the 1985 DC Comics 12-issue limited series Crisis on Infinite Earths, a being known as the Anti-Monitor destroys innumerable universes (including Earth-Three) with an anti-matter wave. To save their son, the Luthors place him in an experimental device which carries the infant to the relative safety of Earth-One.

Alexander materializes on the abandoned satellite which was formerly headquarters of the Justice League. Harbinger takes him in, at the request of the Monitor. His passage through the anti-matter storm grants him power over both matter and anti-matter, dramatically accelerating his aging process. By the end of Crisis Luthor is a young adult, despite the passage of only a few weeks. After the Monitor's death, Alexander helps lead the heroes and villains of the DC Universe against the Anti-Monitor.

After defeating the Anti-Monitor (with the help of Kal-L, the Earth-Two Superman and the Earth-Prime Superboy), Alexander reveals that he has saved Kal-L's wife, the Earth-Two Lois Lane, from being erased from existence when the multiverse was destroyed. The foursome, no longer having a place in the Post-Crisis universe, retreat to a "paradise dimension" (which Alexander accesses with the last of his dimensional powers).

Escape from "Heaven"

Infinite Crisis Secret Files reveals how the four survivors spent the years since the Crisis. The survivors have power over the dimension, and it reacts to their thoughts and emotions. Alexander (who has rapidly aged to his mid-30s) becomes colder and more detached from the well-being of the universe's living beings, progressively becomes as corrupt as his father's villainous counterparts. Superboy-Prime is frustrated, and Alexander uses this opportunity to convince him to help fix reality. Playing on his anger, Alexander only shows him negative aspects of the new reality to convince him that it is inferior; for example, Superboy-Prime appears to be unaware that Hal Jordan and Parallax are separate entities.

 Furiously trying to escape, Superboy-Prime unsuccessfully pounds on the barrier wall of the paradise dimension. This assault on the universe causes "ripples" which alter reality, creating parallel timelines (Hypertime), explaining in-story the real-life changes and retcons in DC continuity over the past 20 years.

Superboy-Prime's efforts frustrate him; he is not as powerful in the post-Crisis heaven, because he has no yellow sun to power him. Eventually Alexander reveals that his own powers are returning, and the two combine forces to break through the barrier wall. Together, they set into motion the events that culminate in Infinite Crisis:
 Superboy-Prime pushes the planet Rann into Thanagar's orbit, destroying Thanagar's ecosystem, sparking the Rann-Thanagar War and shifting the center of the universe away from Oa.
 Alexander poses as Lex Luthor and starts the new Society of Super-Villains.
 Alexander recruits the Psycho-Pirate to place Eclipso's Black Diamond in Jean Loring's Arkham Asylum cell. Loring, as Eclipso, then seduces the Spectre into destroying all magic, leading to the death of the wizard Shazam and the Rock of Eternity's destruction, releasing many demons and causing terrible impacts on magic.
 Superboy-Prime destroys the Justice League Watchtower and abducts Martian Manhunter.
 Alex hijacks control of Brother Eye from Batman, initially giving it sentience before placing it in Maxwell Lord's care. Thus giving him control over the OMACs and Checkmate's files on Earth's metahumans.

Infinite Crisis

Countdown
Alexander watches the events on the post-Crisis Earth for several years with his companions, and eventually convinces a pessimistic Kal-L to break the walls of their paradise to intervene on post-Crisis Earth. Alexander tells Kal-L and his cousin Power Girl that they can help him bring aspects of Earth-Two into predominance over the merged universes (since Earth-One had become predominant Post-Crisis), which will help Earth-Two's Lois Lane recover from her current illness.

"I'm you. Only better."

Lex Luthor does everything in his power to find his impersonator. Assuming the identity Mockingbird, he organizes the Secret Six. Lex eavesdrops on Alexander's transmissions for months, and finally confronts him in the Arctic. When Lex asks who he is, Alexander replies "I'm you. Only better." Alexander also reveals that his presence on Earth is what has been causing Lex' recent erratic behavior and interference to his thought processes. Lex is almost killed by Alexander and Superboy-Prime, but escapes by teleporting away.

Not only is Alexander masquerading as Lex Luthor, he is also using the Society to construct a massive dimensional "tuning fork" (like those in the original Crisis). The structure incorporates heroes and villains from the Earths who combined to form the post-Crisis Earth, and the remains of the Anti-Monitor. (This scheme was not new in DC Comics; in Justice League of America #197, Ultra-Humanite banished super-heroes from Earth-1 and Earth-2 to Limbo and the result—already calculated by the villain—was Earth-2's reality, transformed into a world without heroes.)

The device requires a vast power source to operate, which Alexander generates by manipulating the Spectre into destroying magic (as seen in Day of Vengeance). With sorcerers dead (and their resulting control over magic extinguished), the result is a raw form of magic that the device can tap into; this is personified by the power commanded by the wizard Shazam after his death. He needs lightning provided by one of Shazam's champions, Black Adam, who says the word due to influence from the Psycho-Pirate. Alexander programs the tower by granting sentience to the Brother Eye satellite, allowing the system to evolve into a brain capable of directing the tower's energies and mapping the new multiverse to help him find the perfect Earth he seeks.

With the device Alexander can divide the universe, re-creating the multiverse. He seems successful in recreating Earth-Two (or a close facsimile); however, he notes that this objective is not his ultimate one (which is to gather elements from every Earth to create one single, perfect Earth). With the parallel Earths restored Alexander combines various Earths, randomly bringing them together to observe the result (despite the billions of lives he destroys) and destroying the result if unsuitable. At the center of the universe, Donna Troy and her team see gigantic representations of Alexander's hands creating a rip in space.

As Alexander attempts to combine Earth-Two and Earth-Three (an act which would have killed Superman and Wonder Woman), Firestorm converts all the energy the heroes are firing at the rip into raw positive matter (which destroys Alexander's right index finger). Immediately after, Nightwing, Wonder Girl and Superboy arrive at the tower and free the captives. Superboy-Prime enters the fray; his fight with Conner destroys the tower, and the multiple Earths collapse into a single "New Earth".

His plan foiled, Alexander decides that if he cannot create a perfect Earth, he will take this Earth by force and shape it as best he can. To that end, the Society meets in Metropolis to decimate the remaining heroes (with Doomsday as their champion).

Death

After losing a battle (during which he seriously injures Nightwing with a blast which apparently drains his power), Alexander is held at gunpoint by Batman for severely injuring Nightwing and causing Superboy's death. Wonder Woman stops him, telling Batman that Alex is not worth it; Alex flees, proclaiming that this does not mean that Wonder Woman is "better".

Lex Luthor and the Joker find him hiding in an alley in Gotham City. Alex broods over the failure of his plans (while reflecting that he is already coming up with another plan to achieve his goal), when he is distracted by a noise from further down the alley. The Joker mutilates Alex's face with his acid-flower (and lethal) joy-buzzer and Lex taunts his imposter for his mistakes, including underestimating Lex and excluding the Joker from the Society (the Joker was the only major villain not offered membership in the Society, due to his highly unpredictable nature). The Joker then shoots Alexander point-blank in the head with a shotgun, killing him, while Lex mockingly asks "Now who's stupid?".

In 52 Week Three, the GCPD find a body in an alley resembling Lex Luthor. John Henry Irons examines the body at S.T.A.R. Labs and notices that contact lenses were inserted post-mortem to make the blue eyes appear green (like Lex's). Lex Luthor barges in with a throng of reporters, claiming that the body is that of an impostor from another Earth—the man truly responsible for his crimes.

Although Alexander's body had a missing finger and a different genetic makeup from Lex's, 52 editor Stephen Wacker has confirmed that the body found in Gotham is indeed Alex, and Luthor altered it before police had discovered it.

The Death of the New Gods mini-series (2008) reveals that Alexander was subtly manipulated by the Source into recreating the Multiverse.

Blackest Night
In the 2009–10 Blackest Night storyline, Alexander Luthor has been identified as one of the deceased who is entombed below the Hall of Justice, and his corpse is revived as a Black Lantern during the "Blackest Night" event. Gathering a group of black rings, he sends himself to Earth Prime. Once there he tracks down Superboy Prime (giving him a copy of his old battle suit), and prepares to kill him. Alexander also brings forth those whom Prime had killed during Infinite Crisis and Final Crisis: Legion of 3 Worlds, using the rings to reanimate them as Black Lanterns to aid him in defeating the insane Boy of Steel. The Black Lanterns overwhelm Prime, who voluntarily puts on a black ring. The ring reacts to Prime's mixed emotions (cycling through the emotional spectrum), resulting in a burst of rainbow-colored energy which destroys Alexander and his fellow Black Lanterns.

Justice League of America
Alexander next appears in Justice League of America in 2011. In the Hall of Justice, the Justice League is attacked by the Antimatter Universe's Crime Syndicate of America. They join forces with Doctor Impossible's team to steal Alexander Luthor's corpse, intending to resurrect him in the Chamber of Resurrection. While the other Crime Syndicate members keep the JLA busy, Owlman sneaks off to allow Doctor Impossible access to the resurrection device. At the last moment, Doctor Impossible apparently betrays the Syndicate and substitutes Alexander's corpse for himself to resurrect Darkseid. The plot went awry when the machine instead gave birth to a new villain, known as Omega Man. Alexander is temporarily resurrected by the Tangent Green Lantern later in the story, allowing him to atone for his past misdeeds by helping to defeat the Omega Man and CSA.

Powers and abilities
Alexander's greatest talent is his genius-level intellect which he uses to manipulate other characters, outwit his enemies and engineer the Multiverse Tower. The circumstances of his escape from the doomed Earth-Three give him power over matter and anti-matter, which he can use offensively as bursts of energy or to form and control dimensional portals. He also has a form of precognitive abilities, enabling him to foresee the most probable events. Overuse of his power seems to drain him; following his attempt to restore the Multiverse (and a subsequent attack on Nightwing) he was left apparently as vulnerable as a normal human, clearly terrified when Batman appeared to be about to shoot him, and eventually being killed by the Joker.

See also
Superman (Kal-L)
Superboy-Prime
Crisis on Infinite Earths
Infinite Crisis
Lex Luthor (DC Extended Universe), who is depicted as the son of Lex Luthor Sr.

References

External links

Characters created by George Pérez
Characters created by Jerry Ordway
Characters created by Marv Wolfman
Comics characters introduced in 1985
DC Comics characters who can teleport
DC Comics male superheroes
DC Comics male supervillains
DC Comics metahumans
DC Comics orphans
Fictional characters from parallel universes 
Fictional characters with energy-manipulation abilities
Fictional characters with elemental transmutation abilities
Fictional characters with dimensional travel abilities
Fictional characters with precognition
Fictional characters with psychiatric disorders
Infinite Crisis
Superman characters